Julian Marc Jeanvier (born 31 March 1992) is a professional footballer who plays as a central defender for  club Auxerre and the Guinea national team. He rose to prominence in his native France with Reims, before joining English club Brentford in 2018. He returned to France to join Auxerre in 2022.

Club career

Early years and Nancy
A central defender, Jeanvier began his career in 2000 with hometown club US Clichy-sur-Seine. He moved to L'Entente SSG in 2006 and trained concurrently at Clairefontaine, before joining the academy at Nancy in 2008. Jeanvier progressed into the reserve team and made 54 appearances and scored two goals in the Championnat de France Amateur between 2009 and 2013. The appointment of former head of youth Patrick Gabriel as first team manager midway through the 2012–13 Ligue 1 season saw Jeanvier promoted into the first team squad and he made 10 appearances between January and April 2013. He refused the offer of a new two-year contract extension and departed the Stade Marcel Picot at the end of the 2012–13 season.

Lille
Jeanvier joined Ligue 1 club Lille on a four-year contract during the 2013 off-season. Behind Simon Kjær, Marko Baša, David Rozehnal and Adama Soumaoro in the central defensive pecking order, he was completely out of favour with manager René Girard, who had replaced Rudi Garcia soon after Jeanvier's arrival at the Stade Pierre-Mauroy. He instead played for the reserve team and spent the 2014–15 and 2015–16 seasons on loan at Mouscron-Péruwelz and Red Star respectively. He failed to make a first team appearance and left the club in August 2016.

Reims
In August 2016, Jeanvier dropped into Ligue 2 to join Reims. He established himself in the starting lineup and was voted into the UNFP Ligue 2 Team of the Year at the end of the 2016–17 and 2017–18 seasons. Jeanvier had a successful 2017–18 season, vice-captaining the team and helping the club to the Ligue 2 championship and promotion to Ligue 1. He departed the Stade Auguste-Delaune in July 2018, after making 67 appearances and scoring five goals for the club.

Brentford

2018–19 
On 30 July 2018, Jeanvier moved to England to join Championship club Brentford on a four-year contract, with the option of a further year, for an undisclosed fee, speculated to be £1.8 million. He scored a goal in each of his first two appearances for the club, which came in the early rounds of the EFL Cup, but a foot injury suffered in October 2018 ruled him out for two months. The unavailability of Chris Mepham and new head coach Thomas Frank's deployment of three centre backs saw Jeanvier win a starting place on his return to fitness in December 2018 and he remained a near-ever present starter until the end of the 2018–19 season.

2019–2021 
Despite being behind Pontus Jansson and Ethan Pinnock in the pecking order when either was available, Jeanvier made 27 appearances and scored one goal during the 2019–20 season, but he did not feature during the Bees' unsuccessful playoff campaign. After the signing of Charlie Goode during the 2020 off-season saw Jeanvier demoted further down the pecking order, he joined Turkish Süper Lig club Kasımpaşa on loan for the duration of the 2020–21 season. In late October 2020, after making four appearances, he suffered a season-ending ruptured anterior cruciate ligament injury. Though he would have not been eligible to play if fit, Brentford won promotion to the Premier League after victory in the 2021 Championship playoff Final.

2021–22 
Jeanvier was included in Brentford's 25-man Premier League squad for the 2021–22 season and by mid-November 2021, he had returned to non-contact training. He made his return to non-competitive match play with Brentford B in late March 2022. On 10 April 2022, illness suffered by Pontus Jansson saw Jeanvier named in a matchday squad for the first time since the 2020 Championship play-off Final and he remained an unused substitute during a 2–0 Premier League victory over West Ham United. He was an unused substitute during a five further matches before the end of the Premier League season and was released when his contract expired. During four seasons with Brentford, Jeanvier made 58 appearances and scored six goals.

Auxerre 
In July 2022, Jeanvier joined Championship club Reading on trial and took part in the club's St George's Park training camp, but was not offered a contract. On 18 July 2022, he joined Ligue 1 club Auxerre on a two-week trial and signed a one-year contract, with a one-year option, on 2 August 2022.

International career
Jeanvier was a member of the France U18 team which finished runners-up at the 2010 Copa del Atlántico, but he failed to win a cap. He made his debut for Guinea in a 1–0 friendly defeat to Gambia on 7 June 2019 and made one appearance at the 2019 Africa Cup of Nations. Following  years out of international contention, Jeanvier was recalled to the squad for two 2023 Africa Cup of Nations qualifiers in June 2022. He remained an unused substitute during the first match, before departing the squad due to personal reasons.

Personal life
Jeanvier was born in France and is of Guinean and Guadeloupean descent. His father was also a footballer and played for Red Star. He is married to a Guinean woman and has a Guinean passport.

Career statistics

Club

International

Honours
Reims
 Ligue 2: 2017–18

Individual
 UNFP Ligue 2 Team of the Year: 2016–17, 2017–18

References

External links
 
 
 
 

1992 births
Living people
Sportspeople from Clichy, Hauts-de-Seine
French footballers
Citizens of Guinea through descent
Guinean footballers
Guinea international footballers
Association football defenders
INF Clairefontaine players
AS Nancy Lorraine players
Lille OSC players
Royal Excel Mouscron players
Red Star F.C. players
Stade de Reims players
Brentford F.C. players
Championnat National 2 players
Ligue 1 players
Belgian Pro League players
Championnat National 3 players
Ligue 2 players
English Football League players
2019 Africa Cup of Nations players
French expatriate footballers
Guinean expatriate footballers
Expatriate footballers in Belgium
Expatriate footballers in England
French expatriate sportspeople in Belgium
French expatriate sportspeople in England
French sportspeople of Guinean descent
French people of Guadeloupean descent
Kasımpaşa S.K. footballers
French expatriate sportspeople in Turkey
Expatriate footballers in Turkey
Süper Lig players
Footballers from Hauts-de-Seine
Black French sportspeople
AJ Auxerre players